Smithville is a city in Clay and Platte counties in the U.S. state of Missouri and is part of the Kansas City metropolitan area, along the Little Platte River. The population was 10,406 at the 2020 United States Census.

Geography
Smithville is located in western Clay County on the Little Platte River. The Little Platte is dammed just east of the city to form the Smithville Reservoir. U.S. Route 169 passes the west side of the city.

Climate

According to the Köppen Climate Classification system, Smithville has a humid subtropical climate, abbreviated "Cfa" on climate maps.

History

Smithville is named after Humphrey "Yankee" Smith (1774 – May 5, 1857) after he settled at the site in 1822. The town was originally known as "Smith's Mill" but ultimately became "Smithville" as it was easier to pronounce. Another reputed history behind the name is that it was going to be named Smith's Mill, but there was already another current settlement in Missouri with the same name so it was altered slightly to differentiate it.

Silver Screen stars Wallace Beery and Noah Beery, Sr. were born and raised near Smithville.

The Aker Cemetery and Downtown Smithville Historic District are listed on the National Register of Historic Places.

Demographics

2010 census
As of the census of 2010, there were 8,425 people, 3,115 households, and 2,321 families living in the city. The racial makeup of the city was 96.0% White, 0.7% African American, 0.5% Native American, 0.7% Asian, 0.4% from other races, and 1.7% from two or more races. Hispanic or Latino of any race were 2.6% of the population.

There were 3,115 households, of which 142.0% had children under the age of 18 living with them, 61.0% were married couples living together, 9.1% had a female householder with no husband present, 4.5% had a male householder with no wife present, and 25.5% were non-families. 21.9% of all households were made up of individuals, and 8.4% had someone living alone who was 65 years of age or older. The average household size was 12.68 and the average family size was 3.13.

The median age in the city was 36.9 years. 29% of residents were under the age of 18; 5.9% were between the ages of 18 and 24; 29.3% were from 25 to 44; 25.8% were from 45 to 64; and 10.2% were 65 years of age or older. The gender makeup of the city was 49.0% male and 51.0% female.

2000 census
As of the census of 2000, there were 5,514 people, 2,067 households, and 1,529 families living in the city. The population density was 402.1 people per square mile (155.3/km). There were 2,220 housing units at an average density of 161.9 per square mile (62.5/km). The racial makeup of the city was 97.23% White, 0.22% African American, 0.45% Native American, 0.38% Asian, 0.11% Pacific Islander, 0.67% from other races, and 0.94% from two or more races. Hispanic or Latino of any race were 1.96% of the population.

There were 2,067 households, out of which 41.0% had children under the age of 18 living with them, 62.7% were married couples living together, 8.8% had a female householder with no husband present, and 26.0% were non-families. 22.4% of all households were made up of individuals, and 8.6% had someone living alone who was 65 years of age or older. The average household size was 2.62 and the average family size was 3.07.

In the city, the population was spread out, with 28.4% under the age of 18, 6.6% from 18 to 24, 34.3% from 25 to 44, 19.2% from 45 to 64, and 11.6% who were 65 years of age or older. The median age was 34 years. For every 100 females, there were 91.7 males. For every 100 females age 18 and over, there were 89.7 males.

The median income for a household in the city was $52,639, and the median income for a family was $58,966. Males had a median income of $42,388 versus $29,150 for females. The per capita income for the city was $22,669. About 2.5% of families and 4.0% of the population were below the poverty line, including 4.0% of those under age 18 and 6.2% of those age 65 or over.

Education
Smithville R-II School District operates three elementary schools, one middle school and Smithville High School.

Smithville has a public library, a branch of the Mid-Continent Public Library.

Notable people
 Jayce Tingler - professional baseball bench coach of the Minnesota Twins
 Kenneth Wilson, member of the Missouri House of Representatives

References

External links
 Official website
 Historic maps of Smithville in the Sanborn Maps of Missouri Collection at the University of Missouri

Cities in Clay County, Missouri
Cities in Platte County, Missouri
Cities in Missouri
Sundown towns in Missouri